Jack Egan may refer to:

 Jack Egan (boxer) (1878–1950), American boxer
 Jack Egan (Australian footballer) (born 1898), Australian footballer
 Jack Egan (hurler) (1904–1984), Irish hurler
 Jack Egan (Kilkenny hurler) (1921–1994), Irish hurler
 Jack Egan (footballer) (born 1998), English footballer
 John Egan (basketball) (born 1940s), American basketball guard